Henry Gower (or Henry de Gower) was a medieval canon lawyer,  college fellow, university chancellor, and bishop.

Gower was a Fellow of Merton College, Oxford in England and Chancellor of the University of Oxford during 1322–24. He was a professor of canon law. He was briefly Archdeacon of St David's in Wales before becoming Bishop of St David's from 1328 to 1347.

See also
 Gower in Wales

References

Year of birth unknown
Year of death unknown
Canonical theologians
Fellows of Merton College, Oxford
Chancellors of the University of Oxford
Bishops of St Davids
14th-century Roman Catholic bishops in Wales
Archdeacons of St Davids
English male writers
14th-century Welsh lawyers
14th-century English lawyers